Einar Hole Moxnes (11 June 1921 in Alstahaug – 20 January 2006 in Trondheim) was a Norwegian politician for the Centre Party.

He was elected to the Norwegian Parliament from Sør-Trøndelag in 1969, and
served as a deputy representative during the terms 1958–1961, 1961–1965, 1965–1969 and 1973–1977. From 1965 to 1968 he met as a regular representative, replacing Per Borten who was Prime Minister.

He was the acting Minister of Fisheries from March to November 1968 during the cabinet Borten. On 8 November, he was formally appointed to the position. During this period he was replaced in the Norwegian Parliament by Olina Storsand. He lost the job when the cabinet Borten fell in 1971, but he returned as Minister of Agriculture from 1972 to 1973 during the cabinet Korvald. During this period he was replaced in the Norwegian Parliament by Johan Syrstad.

On the local level he was mayor of Åfjord municipality from 1955 to 1966. From 1958 to 1963 he was also a member of Sør-Trøndelag county council. His political career ended with the position of County Governor of Sør-Trøndelag, which he held from 1974 to 1986.

References

1921 births
2006 deaths
People from Alstahaug
People from Åfjord
Government ministers of Norway
Ministers of Agriculture and Food of Norway
Mayors of places in Sør-Trøndelag
Members of the Storting
Centre Party (Norway) politicians
County governors of Norway
20th-century Norwegian politicians